Haven is the fifth studio album by Swedish melodic death metal band Dark Tranquillity, released on 25 July 2000. This release is the first to feature Mikael Niklasson and Martin Brändström, and the first release with Martin Henriksson on guitar, switching from his previous position on bass.

Style
Haven retains the electronic music elements of past albums, along with appealing song composition and more polished production. As with the previous album, Projector, Mikael Stanne uses clean and harsh vocals.

Track listing

Videos
 "Therein" (first digipak and Japan only)

Reception
Like the previous album, Projector, critical reception was mixed. Guitarist Niklas Sundin has been quite critical of the album, stating that this is his least favourite Dark Tranquillity album, considering it "too safe in places" and stating that the album "could probably benefit from more variation". Despite the mixed feelings towards Haven, MetalGuru listed it #5 in its "Retro 2000 Top 5 Albums." AllMusic called it "inspired" and a "career milestone".

Release history

Credits

Dark Tranquillity
 Mikael Stanne − vocals
 Niklas Sundin − lead guitar
 Martin Henriksson − rhythm guitar
 Michael Nicklasson − bass
 Martin Brändström − keyboards, electronics
 Anders Jivarp − drums

Other Personnel
Christer Lundberg - creative assistance
Anders Fridén - engineering
Fredrik Nordström - engineering
Kerstin Rössler - photography
Lindor Tidang - photography
Göran Finnberg - mastering
Ulf Horbelt - remastering
 Niklas Sundin − artwork

References

Dark Tranquillity albums
2000 albums
Century Media Records albums
Albums recorded at Studio Fredman
Albums produced by Fredrik Nordström